The Florianturm (Florian Tower, Florian for short) is a telecommunications tower and landmark of Dortmund (Germany). It is named after St. Florian, the patron saint of gardeners.

At the time it was briefly the highest freestanding structure in Germany.

The tower was constructed similarly to a high concrete chimney. At  there is a building part with two floors. On the lower floor there are operation rooms and on the upper floor at  there is a revolving restaurant. At  and  there are two observation decks.

On the upper observation deck there are installations and aerials of Deutsche Telekom. Since 1959 it has been used for transmitting television signals.

On 7 September 2004, a Russian helicopter was used to replace the aerial. Since then, a 50-kilowatt transmitter has transmitted digital terrestrial television programmes for the Dortmund area.

From 1996 to 1998, the tower was renovated and safety standards were brought up to date.

In 2000, a catwalk for bungee jumping was opened on the upper platform. It was closed in 2003 after a fatal accident and was removed in July 2008.

Data
architect: Will Schwarz, Dortmund
construction time: May 1958 – April 1959
depth of basement: 8.10 m, the lowest part of the substructure is 110.3 m above sea level
diameter of basement: 25 m
thickness of basement plate: 2.5 m
total weight: approx. 7,700 t
volume of cement: approx. 1,385 t
total weight of concrete: approx. 3,400 m³
total weight of steel: approx. 660 t
stability ratio: 3.5x

See also
List of towers

External links

Fernsehturm-Dortmund

Towers completed in 1959
Buildings and structures in Dortmund
Communication towers in Germany
Towers with revolving restaurants
Observation towers
1959 establishments in West Germany